Emanuele Fiume (born 17 May 1997) is an Italian male rower bronze medal winner at senior level at the European Rowing Championships.

References

External links
 

1997 births
Living people
Italian male rowers
Rowers of Fiamme Gialle